Molly's Theory of Relativity is a 2013 American drama film written and directed by Jeff Lipsky and starring Sophia Takal.

Cast
Sophia Takal as Molly
Lawrence Michael Levine as Zak
Reed Birney as Asher
Daisy Tahan as Ruby
Cady Huffman as Natasha
Rebecca Schull as Sylvie
Adam LeFevre as Boris
Tom Morrissey as Uncle Eli
Nicholas Lampiasi as Chet

Reception
The film has a 10% rating on Rotten Tomatoes, based on ten reviews with an average rating of 3.65/10.  Time Out awarded the film one star out of five.  Andrew Schenker of Slant Magazine awarded the film two stars out of four.

References

External links
 
 

American drama films
2013 drama films
2013 films
2010s English-language films
2010s American films